John Halcyon Styn is an American blogger, entrepreneur, motivational speaker, web designer, author, and Web celebrity, who "pushed the boundaries of online self-expression" through his various online projects.  He is currently the co-founder of 1st Saturdays,  a homeless outreach project, and the host of Hug Nation.

Career
Styn worked as the first webmaster for Sony's Station e-commerce mall and for CollegeClub.com

Styn has won two Webby Awards, the first, as the designer and star of his personal website, cockybastard.com, and the second for a Hug Nation video podcast.

Other projects have included:
Fears. Regrets. Desires, an NBC Internet-only, confessional story-sharing show. Host.
FreshRealm, a food shipping company that uses reusable shipping technology.  Chief Wisdom Officer.
Anybeat, a social networking service based on pseudonymity.
1st Saturdays, a homeless outreach project based in San Diego.
Hug Nation, which won the "people's choice" Webby Award in 2007.
Pinkgasm.com, an "alternative sexuality site" that sponsored the Masturbate-a-thon events.
Pink Aid, a charity originally started to raise money for victims of Hurricane Katrina.
"I-Bridge International", an Internet services company.
CitizenX.com, an experimental webcam community.
TheRealHouse, a live webcam-house that ran from 2000–2002
The book, Love more. Fear less. (2010)

Blogging career

Styn bought his first URL in 1996 to put his self-published zine, Prehensile Tales, on the web.  This first autobiographical ezine ran from 1996 to 2000.

He first achieved internet notoriety when one of his stories got him into trouble with Fruit of the Loom.  When they sent a cease and desist order on March 2, 1998 demanding that he take down a parody of their logo that he made for a blog post.  The post is still  up.

He is also a contributor for the Burning Blog, the official blog of Burning Man.

Awards and nominations

References

External links

Styn's TEDx talk
John Halcyon Styn's YouTube Channel

Living people
1971 births
Writers from San Diego
American designers
Web designers
American male writers
Webby Award winners